The 1933 Iowa State Cyclones football team represented Iowa State College of Agricultural and Mechanic Arts (later renamed Iowa State University) in the Big Six Conference during the 1933 college football season. In their third season under head coach George F. Veenker, the Cyclones compiled a 3–5–1 record (1–4 against conference opponents), finished in fifth place in the conference, and were outscored by opponents by a combined total of 120 to 73. They played their home games at State Field in Ames, Iowa.

Magnus Lichter was the team captain. No Iowa State player was selected as a first-team all-conference player.

Schedule

References

Iowa State
Iowa State Cyclones football seasons
Iowa State Cyclones football